The Wildflower! Arts and Music Festival is an event held annually in Richardson, Texas, and typically has a turn out of about 70,000 people. It began in 1993 as a small community event held in a local park in northeast Richardson, Texas, and got its name from the March through May celebration season when wildflowers blossom throughout the city. Having just celebrated its 23rd anniversary in 2015, Wildflower! is now a three-day event that has grown to become one of North Texas’ most recognized and anticipated music festivals. The name Wildflower!, when referring to the festival, is always spelled with an exclamation point.

Completely produced and managed by the city of Richardson, Wildflower! is located a few minutes north of Dallas at Galatyn Parkway and US 75. Festival programming includes four outdoor and two indoor performance stages featuring local, regional and headliner bands, the WF! Kids, strolling entertainers/buskers in Performance Row, interactive displays and exhibits, the WF! Marketplace, the award-winning Performing Songwriter Contest and Stage, the Battle of the Bands competition, the Art Guitar Auction, the Budding Talent Competition, and your favorite festival treats.

History 

Begun as a springtime community event to celebrate the wild flowers planted throughout the city, Wildflower! grew in 1995 when headliner bands were added.

Growing crowds and subsequent logistical challenges lead the festival to its first move from Breckinridge Park to the Greenway Corporate Office Park at US75 and Campbell Rd. It was there that the fledgling event was able to expand to three days and eventually grew to cover over  featuring multiple stages, arts, music, exhibits, and family activities.

Experiencing more growing pains, the event moved in 2002 to its present location, the Galatyn Park Urban Center. With its new home, the festival was now able to offer the Eisemann Center for Performing Arts, a festival plaza, a DART light rail station, the AMLI Galatyn Station Luxury Apartments, the Renaissance Hotel as well as use of the greenway space belonging to State Farm.

Lineups

References

External links 
Official web site

Music festivals established in 1993
Music festivals in Texas
Richardson, Texas
Spring festivals in the United States
1993 establishments in Texas